Dominique Lebrun (born 9 September 1950) is a French artist, journalist and american cinema historian.

Biography 
Lebrun started his movie posters collection when he was 10, reclaiming them from local theaters. He also collected photos and movie magazines, including Cinémonde, out of which he cut photos of actors to paste them in his school notebooks.

In the early seventies, he moved to Paris and had many different occupations including projectionist at the Espace Pierre Cardin, archivist and researcher for producer André Paulvé and assistant for a primitive art gallery. He then became a cinema historian and journalist.

In 1972 and 1974, he took part in Monsieur Cinéma, a popular French television game show of movie trivia, hosted by Pierre Tchernia.

Paris Hollywood, his first film book, was published in 1987. It is a tribute to all the French actors, directors, technicians and writers who contributed to the history of American cinema. To write this book, Lebrun gathered photos and interviews in both Paris and Los Angeles, over a span of ten years.

For this work, Lebrun was invited in several French TV shows, including Apostrophes hosted by Bernard Pivot and Du Côté de chez Fred de Frédéric Mitterrand.

In 1992, Trans Europe Hollywood was published. In his second film book, he explores the contribution of Europeans to American Cinema.

In 1996, he wrote Hollywood, a history of Hollywood studios from 1914 to 1969, published both in French and English.

Over these years, Lebrun also contributed to the Catalogue du Musée du Cinéma Henri-Langlois, Paris museum of Cinema's catalogue, and the Dictionnaire de la Mode au XXe siècle, a dictionary of twentieth century fashion. He also performed in several short films including Cough Therapy and Antoine directed by Jean-Philippe Laraque.

He started his artistic work in 2008, and made his first collage using his collection of Mon Ciné 1920's movie magazines. He then decided to continue exploring this path, turning this time to his collection of movie posters.

In 2011, his first exhibition took place at Flora Jansen Gallery in Paris, on Matignon avenue. Since then, his work has been shown in exhibitions in Paris, Saint-Tropez and Bruxelles. In 2018, he made his U.S. debut in Los Angeles.

In June 2021, Lebrun Dechirures, a monography about his work, is published in Paris, including an exclusive text by french critic Pascal Mérigeau.

Style, technique, and reception 
Lebrun uses intact original film posters from his own collection. He tears them up, then pastes the pieces on canvas. He imagines and builds new stories, recomposing portraits, scenes or abstract figures.

He says that he uses pieces of posters like a painter uses colors; that through stacks and layers, he's trying to create motion; that he makes use of the image of stars or unknown actors, to conceive new characters, be they male, female or hybrid.

He talks about the unexpected and extreme pleasure he experiences, when tearing up and caressing paper; and about his urge to convey, through his work, emotions as intense as his passion for cinema.

Exhibitions 
 2011 : Collages Galerie Flora Jansem, avenue Matignon, Paris
 2014 : Purgatoire, rue de Paradis, Paris
 2015 : Galerie Origine, rue des Ecouffes, Paris
 2016 : Rips Galerie BY Chatel, rue des Tournelles, Paris
 2016 : Hotel La Vigne, Ramatuelle
 2017 : All My Movies Espace Beaurepaire, Paris
 2017 : Saint-Tropez-des-Prés Hôtel de Paris, Saint-Tropez
 2017 : The Cow Parade at the Movies La Baule - Dinard - Deauville
 2018 : A Scent of Taboo Galerie Émilie Dujat, Bruxelles
 2018 : Icon Remix THE LAB by Please Do Not Enter, Los Angeles
 2019 : The Sixth Space THE LAB by Please Do Not Enter, Las Vegas
 2019 : Palm Springs Fine Art Fair, by Please Do Not Enter, Palm Springs
2020 : 10 Years Already, B Gallery, Paris
2020 : Atelier Beyond The Walls, Espace Beaurepaire, Paris
2021 : Stars Destruction Transformations, Espace Beaurepaire, Paris

Works

Bibliography 
 1987 : Paris-Hollywood, Hazan 
 1988 : L'élégance française au cinéma, Musée de la Mode et du Costume 
 1991 : Musée du Cinéma Henri-Langlois, Maeght 
 1992 : Trans Europe Hollywood - les européens du Cinéma américain, Bordas 
 1993 : Von Europa Nach Hollywood - Die Europäer im amerikanischen Kino Henschel Verlag 
 1994 : Dictionnaire de la Mode au  (en collaboration), Éditions Du Regard 
 1996 : Hollywood, Hazan 
 1996 : Hollywood, Gingko  
 2021 : Lebrun Dechirures

Filmography 
 2003 : Cough Therapy, short film by Jean-Philippe Laraque
 2006 : The Belly of the Bear, short film by Jean-Philippe Laraque
 2007 : Antoine, short film by Jean-Philippe Laraque
 2015 : Dominique Lebrun, Rips - MIFAC 2017 - International Contemporary Artists Film Festival
 2016 : Dominique Lebrun Art Show – Saint Tropez des Prés
 2018 : Dominique Lebrun Happening – A Scent of Taboo - Brussels
2020 : 10 Anni by Dominique Lebrun – video art directed by Jean-Philippe Laraque
2020 : Solito by Dominique Lebrun – video art directed by Jean-Philippe Laraque

References

Further reading

External links 
 Official website
 Dominique Lebrun photographed by Robert Doisneau gettyimages
 

Writers from Saint-Brieuc
French film historians
French male artists
1950 births
Living people
20th-century French artists
21st-century French artists
Artists from Saint-Brieuc